Kozaršče is a small village northwest of Most na Soči in the Municipality of Tolmin in the Littoral region of Slovenia.

The local church, built on a hill to the north of the settlement, is dedicated to the Holy Name of Mary. It belongs to the Parish of Volče and dates back to the 12th century.

References

External links
Kozaršče on Geopedia

Populated places in the Municipality of Tolmin